Barhampur Assembly constituency is one of the 126 assembly constituencies of  Assam a north east state of India.  Barhampur is also part of Nowgong Lok Sabha constituency.

Town Details

Country: India.
 State: Assam.
 District: Nagaon district.
 Lok Sabha Constituency: Nowgong Lok Sabha/Parliamentary constituency.
 Assembly Categorisation: Rural
 Literacy Level: 73.78%.
 Eligible Electors as per 2021 General Elections: 1,79,107. Eligible Electors. Male Electors:83,020. Female Electors:78,999.
 Geographic Co-Ordinates:  26°17'03.8"N 92°46'30.7"E.
 Total Area Covered: 409 square kilometres.
 Area Includes: Nizsahar, Singia Potani and Kondoli mouzas in Nowgong thana, Kampur Mouza in Kampur thana- Kathiatali Mouza in Jamunamukh thana, and Chalchali Mouza in Samaguri thana, in Nowgong sub- division of Nagaon district of Assam.
 Inter State Border :Nagaon.
 Number Of Polling Stations: Year 2011-182,Year 2016-191,Year 2021-87.

Members of Legislative Assembly

 1972: Kehoram Hazarika, Communist Party of India.
 1978: Lakeshwar Gohain, Janata Party.
 1983: Ramesh Phukan, Indian National Congress.
 1985: Girindra Kumar Baruah, Independent.
 1991: Prafulla Kumar Mahanta, Asom Gana Parishad.
 1996: Prafulla Kumar Mahanta, Asom Gana Parishad.
 2001: Prafulla Kumar Mahanta, Asom Gana Parishad.
 2006: Prafulla Kumar Mahanta, Asom Gana Parishad (Progressive).
 2011: Prafulla Kumar Mahanta, Asom Gana Parishad.
 2016: Prafulla Kumar Mahanta, Asom Gana Parishad.
 2021: Jitu Goswami, Bharatiya Janata Party.

Election results

2016 results

See also
 List of constituencies of Assam Legislative Assembly

References

External links 
 

Assembly constituencies of Assam
Nagaon
Nagaon district